John Gleeson (born 1941) is an Irish retired hurler who played as a right corner-back for the Tipperary senior team.

Gleeson joined the team during the 1966 championship and was a regular member of the starting fifteen until his retirement after the 1974 championship. During that time he won one All-Ireland medal and two Munster medals.

At club level Gleeson was a double county club championship medalist with Moneygall.

References

1941 births
Living people
Moneygall hurlers
Tipperary inter-county hurlers
Munster inter-provincial hurlers
All-Ireland Senior Hurling Championship winners